Ravi M. Gupta, also known as Radhika Ramana Dasa, is a notable Vaishnava scholar, author, and editor. Gupta holds the Charles Redd Chair of Religious Studies at Utah State University, and serves as director of its Religious Studies program. He is a member of the International Society for Krishna Consciousness.

Early life and education
In Boise, Idaho, he was raised and home-schooled along with his younger brother with a curriculum based mostly on the Srimad Bhagavatam (Bhagavata Purana), from which he learned English, comprehension skills, critical thinking, debate, and communication. He also took maths and science as separate subjects, as well as Sanskrit, which he loved.

At the age of thirteen he enrolled at the Boise State University, and in 1999 when he was seventeen he received a Bachelor of Arts in Philosophy and a Bachelor of Science in Applied Mathematics as well as the University's highest honor, the Silver Medallion. He recalls,

He enrolled at the University of Oxford at the age of seventeen, their youngest student ever, and in 2000 he received a Master of Studies (MSt) in the Study of Religion.

In 2004, he received a Doctor of Philosophy (DPhil) in Hinduism from the University of Oxford. At the age of twenty-two, he became the youngest-ever student to gain a doctorate at the world-famous University. His thesis focused on the early development of Vedanta philosophy in the Chaitanya Vaishnava tradition, based on original manuscript sources.

Career
In addition to his work at Utah State, Gupta has taught at the University of Florida, Centre College, and the College of William & Mary.

Gupta holds the Charles Redd Chair of Religious Studies and serves as director of the Religious Studies Program at Utah State University, and was a visiting scholar at the Maxwell Institute during fall 2020.  He is a permanent research fellow of the Oxford Centre for Hindu Studies and a past president of the Society for Hindu-Christian Studies.

His research areas are world religions, Hinduism, Sanskrit, and religious studies (theory and method). His research interests include the Bhagavata Purana's Sanskrit commentaries, Vaishnava bhakti traditions, interreligious dialogue, and the relationship between faith, scholarship, religion and ecology.

Selected publications
Books

References

Boise State University alumni
Alumni of the University of Oxford
Fellows of Linacre College, Oxford
American people of Indian descent
People from Boise, Idaho
College of William & Mary faculty
Centre College faculty
American Hare Krishnas
Bhaktivedanta College
Living people
Hindu studies scholars
Academics of the Oxford Centre for Hindu Studies
Year of birth missing (living people)